Ralph Roberts may refer to:
Ralph J. Roberts (1920–2015), American businessman, co-founder of Comcast Communications
Ralph J. Roberts (geologist) (1911–2007), American geologist
Ralph Roberts (automotive designer), car designer who worked for the Chrysler Corporation
Ralph R. Roberts, Doorkeeper of the United States House of Representatives, c. 1944–1947
Ralph Arthur Roberts (1884–1940), German film actor
Ralph Roberts (sailor) (born 1935), New Zealand sailor
Ralph Roberts (author), contributor to Alternate Presidents
Ralph Roberts, a fictional character from Stephen King's novel Insomnia